The 2022–23 Dream11 Super Smash was the eighteenth season of the men's Super Smash Twenty20 cricket competition played in New Zealand. It took place between 23 December 2022 and 11 February 2023, with 6 provincial teams taking part. Northern Brave were the defending champions.

The tournament ran running alongside the 2022–23 Plunket Shield and 2022–23 Ford Trophy.

Northern Brave won the tournament after beating Canterbury Kings in the final, winning their fourth title.

Competition format
Teams played in a double round-robin in a group of six, therefore playing 10 matches overall. Matches were played using a Twenty20 format. The top team in the group advanced straight to the final, whilst the second and third placed teams played off in an elimination final.

The group worked on a points system with positions being based on the total points. Points were awarded as follows:

Win: 4 points 
Tie: 2 points 
Loss: 0 points
Abandoned/No Result: 2 points

Points table

 Advances to Grand Final
 Advance to Elimination Final

Fixtures

Round-robin

Finals

Elimination Final

Grand Final

References

External links
 Series home at ESPN Cricinfo

Super Smash (cricket)
2022–23 New Zealand cricket season
Super Smash (men's cricket)